Halobates sericeus, the Pacific pelagic water strider, is a species of water strider in the family Gerridae. It is found in Australia, the East Pacific, Indo-West Pacific, North America, Oceania, and temperate Asia.

References

Further reading

 

Halobatinae
Articles created by Qbugbot
Insects described in 1822